Patricia Lewsley-Mooney CBE (born 3 March 1957) is an Irish former politician who was the  Northern Ireland Commissioner for Children and Young People from 2007 to 2014. She was previously  a Social Democratic and Labour Party (SDLP)  Member of the Northern Ireland Assembly (MLA) for Lagan Valley from 1998 to 2006.

Background
Born in Belfast, Lewsley attended the University of Ulster before working as a cook and an advice worker.  She is married with five children and six grandchildren.

Political career
She stood unsuccessfully for the Social Democratic and Labour Party (SDLP) at the 1997 local elections in Belfast.

In 1998, she was elected to the Northern Ireland Assembly representing the Social Democratic and Labour Party in Lagan Valley, a seat she held in 2003. During her time as an MLA she chaired All-Party Assembly Groups on Children and Young People, Disability, Diabetes, Anti-Poverty, and Ethnic minorities. On the day the Assembly was suspended in 2002, she had been due to introduce a Private Members Bill to strengthen child protection arrangements in Northern Ireland, by placing Area Child Protection Committees on a statutory footing.

In 2001, she was elected to Lisburn City Council. She was a co-founder of Shopmobility in Belfast and initiated the appointment of the only Disability/Equal Opportunity Officer in local government.

On 19 December 2006, Lewsley resigned from the Assembly in order to take up a post as Northern Ireland Commissioner for Children and Young People, and took up that post on 8 January 2007.  She served two four-year terms as Commissioner and her final term came to an end in January 2015.

She was appointed Commander of the Order of the British Empire (CBE) in the 2015 New Year Honours for services to children's rights in Northern Ireland.

References

External links
Northern Ireland Assembly – Biographies – Patricia Lewsley
 http://www.niccy.org

1957 births
Living people
Alumni of Ulster University
Members of Lisburn City Council
Northern Ireland MLAs 1998–2003
Northern Ireland MLAs 2003–2007
Children's Ombudsmen
Ombudsmen in Northern Ireland
Politicians from Belfast
Social Democratic and Labour Party MLAs
Female members of the Northern Ireland Assembly
Commanders of the Order of the British Empire
20th-century women politicians from Northern Ireland
Women councillors in Northern Ireland